Dingaan Jacob Myolwa is a South African politician from the Eastern Cape who is a Member of the National Assembly for the African National Congress (ANC). He was appointed to parliament in 2021. Myolwa had previously served as a member of the Eastern Cape Provincial Legislature from 2013 to 2014 and before that, as mayor of the OR Tambo District Municipality.

Background
Myolwa is a member of the African National Congress. He was a member of Umkhonto we Sizwe and while in exile in Tanzania, he served in a military camp. He has international certificates in Local Government and administration. Myolwa served as an ANC PR councillor in the Ingquza Hill Local Municipality as well as in the OR Tambo District Municipality. He was the mayor of the OR Tambo District until his dismissal in 2013.

Myolwa was sworn in as a member of the Eastern Cape Provincial Legislature for the ANC on 22 October 2013, replacing Mkhangeli Matomela. He was then appointed to serve on the local government & traditional affairs, sport, recreation, arts and culture, economic development and environmental affairs and tourism, public participation and petitions and wellness & enabling facilities committees.

Myolwa stood for the National Assembly of South Africa in the 2014 general election as 23rd on the ANC's list of National Assembly candidates from the Eastern Cape. He was not elected to parliament. Myolwa stood for parliament again in 2019 as 21st on the ANC's list of parliamentary candidates from the Eastern Cape. He was not elected for the second time.

Parliamentary career
Following the death of Eastern Cape ANC MP Pumza Dyantyi from COVID-19, Myolwa was selected to take up her seat in the National Assembly. He was sworn in on 27 January 2021. He serves on the Standing Committee on Auditor General.

References

External links

Profile at Parliament of South Africa

Living people
Year of birth missing (living people)
Place of birth missing (living people)
People from the Eastern Cape
Xhosa people
African National Congress politicians
Members of the Eastern Cape Provincial Legislature
Members of the National Assembly of South Africa